Seven Oaks General Hospital (SOGH) is a community hospital in Winnipeg, Manitoba, Canada.

It was founded in 1981 by community leaders and approved by the province of Manitoba to serve the needs of the northern part of Winnipeg and surrounding area. Seven Oaks is also a hub for kidney health services, a centre for general surgery and orthopedic surgery, and has a large commitment to family medicine, both in terms of in-patient medical care, but also as a centre for the training of medical residents and the home of a new private medical clinic. The hospital also offers aboriginal health services, an access to care clinic, an intensive care unit, lab and diagnostic services, a library, an oncology clinic, as well as mental health and spiritual care.

SOGH is adjoined by the Wellness Institute, a fitness center that includes programs for youth and adults for rehabilitation and health maintenance.

History 
In 1996, the Wellness Institute was built to promote health and wellness.

In 2017, the Seven Oaks General Hospital has opened a new space for medical researchers looking at the prevention, early identification, and treatment of chronic disease including diabetes, hypertension, and chronic kidney disease. The Chronic Disease Innovation Centre, home to a research team affiliated with the University of Manitoba's Rady Faculty of Medicine uses 'big data' to identify and prevent chronic disease, and improve health care effectiveness.

As of mid-September 2019, the Intensive Care Unit was planned to close down. This shutdown was part of the realignment of health services in the Winnipeg Metro area, under the Winnipeg Regional Health Authority.

References

Bibliography 
"Showing the way forward on kidney health" Canstar Community News. Retrieved 16 January 2013
"Home dialysis boon to quality of life" Interlake Today. Retrieved 22 August 2012
"Seven Oaks, WRHA officially unveil upgrades" Canstar Community News. Retrieved 24 October 2012

External links
Seven Oaks General Hospital
 The Wellness Institute -  lifestyle medicine department of Seven Oaks General Hospital
Chinese hospitals to adopt award-winning Winnipeg health program
China looks to Seven Oaks model for chronic disease management and prevention
Chinese delegation learns about wellness at Seven Oaks

Hospital buildings completed in 1981
Hospitals in Winnipeg
Hospitals established in 1981
General_Hospital